Quell may refer to:

 Slang for the drug quetiapine (Seroquel)
 Quell (video game), an iOS and Android video game
 Quell (wearable), a wearable device that claims to offer relief from chronic pain